Sam Brown (January 19, 1939 –  December 27, 1977) was an American jazz guitarist.

History

Sam T. Brown's playing style was unusual in that he performed in a generally jazz-rock format, while performing in Keith Jarrett's ensembles that sometimes veered close to a free jazz style.  His initial recording success included membership of the jazz rock group Ars Nova during the 1967-1969 period.

Brown's most noteworthy recorded performances were on recordings of Keith Jarrett (particularly, his "American band" with Dewey Redman); and Charlie Haden's Liberation Music Orchestra. On the Liberation Music Orchestra album he has a spotlighted performance on the 21-minute suite, "El Quinto Regimiento/Los Cuatro Generales/Viva la Quince Brigada".

He also performed as a session musician for popular artists as diverse as James Brown, Astrud Gilberto, Peter Allen and Barry Manilow.

Discography

As sideman
With Louis Armstrong
Louis Armstrong and His Friends (Flying Dutchman/Amsterdam, 1970)
With Carla Bley
 Escalator over the Hill (JCOA 1971)
With Gary Burton
 Good Vibes (Atlantic, 1969)
 Gary Burton & Keith Jarrett (Atlantic, 1970)
 Live in Tokyo (Atlantic, 1971)
With Ron Carter
 Uptown Conversation (Embryo, 1970)
 Blues Farm (CTI, 1973)
With Richard Davis
 The Philosophy of the Spiritual (Cobblestone, 1971)
With Paul Desmond
 Bridge over Troubled Water: Paul Desmond plays the songs of Simon and Garfunkel (CTI, 1970)
'With Bill Evans
 Living Time the Bill Evans-George Russell Orchestra(Columbia, 1972)
   From Left to Right (Verve 1971)
With Astrud Gilberto
 Gilberto with Turrentine with Stanley Turrentine (CTI, 1971)
With Gene Harris
 Gene Harris of the Three Sounds (Blue Note, 1972)
With Keith Jarrett
 Expectations (Columbia, 1971)
 Treasure Island (1974)
With Hubert Laws
 Flute By-Laws (Atlantic, 1966)
 Laws' Cause (Atlantic, 1968)
With Thad Jones/Mel Lewis Big Band
 Central Park North (1969)
With the Liberation Music Orchestra
 Liberation Music Orchestra (1969)
With Mike Mainieri
Journey Thru an Electric Tube (Solid State, 1968)
With Herbie Mann
 First Light (Atlantic, 1974)
 Surprises (Atlantic, 1976)
 Gagaku & Beyond (Finnadar/Atlantic, 1974 [1976])
With Dave Matthews Big Band
 Night Flight (1977)
 Live at the Five Spot (1975)
With Gary McFarland
 Profiles (Impulse!, 1966)
 Simpático with Gábor Szabó (Impulse!, 1966)
With Blue Mitchell
 Many Shades of Blue (Mainstream, 1974)
With Paul Motian
 Conception Vessel (ECM, 1971)
 Tribute (ECM, 1974)
With Mark Murphy 
Bridging a Gap (Muse, 1972)
With Duke Pearson
 The Phantom (1968)
With Pat Rebillot
 Free Fall (1974)
With Jeremy Steig
 Legwork (Solid State, 1970) 
Wayfaring Stranger (Blue Note, 1971)

As guest
 1974 Peter Allen, Continental American

References

External links
[ allmusic.com biographical site]

1939 births
1977 deaths
musicians from St. Louis
American jazz guitarists
20th-century American guitarists